The Ziauddin University; abbreviated as ZU) is a private university located in Karachi, Sindh, Pakistan. The university is named after the educationist, Ziauddin Ahmad.

History 
Established in 1986, Ziauddin University was founded in the memory of Sir Dr. Ziauddin Ahmad by his daughter and son-in-law. The School of Nursing was founded in 1986 and is accredited by the Pakistan Nursing Council. The institution became the College of Nursing in 2009, and since then, it has offered a variety of graduate and undergraduate programmes. The Sindh government approved the creation of the Dr. Ziauddin Post Graduate Institute of Medical Sciences in August 1994.

The Ziauddin Medical University received its charter as Ziauddin University on December 13, 2005, under the name 'The Ziauddin University' (Amendment ACT 2003).

Recognized university
Ziauddin University is recognized and accredited by the Higher Education Commission of Pakistan. 

The Ziauddin University is a university chartered under The Ziauddin Medical University Act, 1995 that has been amended twice under The Ziauddin University (Amendment) Act, 2018 and The Ziauddin University (Amendment) Act, 2021.

Faculty of Law, Politics & Governance ("ZFLPG") 
Originally known as Faculty of Law ("ZFL") was established in September 2018 under the Dean Shaaista Sarki. In April 2019 approval from the professional regulatory body Pakistan Bar Council was achieved to start the 5-year LLB law degree program. An Associates Degree Program for 2-years was also approved by the Board of Governors at Ziauddin University that was launched in September 2021. The name change from ZFL to ZFLPG was finalized and approved in early January 2022 by the Board of Governors. There are plans to begin an external 3-year LLB program along with a master's level LLM program in International Commercial Law from the United Kingdom in partnership with a University of Northampton that is projected to start in September 2022. 

ZFLPG also runs multiple centers focused in particular areas of law conducting research, projects, seminars & workshops, namely:

 Centre for Access to Justice ("ZCFAJ") {2018}
 Centre for Human Rights ("ZC4HR") {2019}
 Centre for Law & Technology ("ZCFLT") {2020}
 Centre for International & Constitutional Law ("ZCICL") {2021}

Ziauddin Medical College
 Bachelor of Medicine, Bachelor of Surgery (MBBS)
 MPhil
 MPhil Leading to Ph.D. in Health Sciences
 Doctor Of Medicine (MD)
 Master Of Surgery (MS)
 Clinical diplomas

College of Dentistry
 Bachelor Of Dental Surgery (BDS)
 MPhil Oral Biology
 MPhil Oral Pathology

College of Pharmacy
 PharmD

College of Nursing
 MS Nursing
 Post Registered Nurse BS Nursing
 BS Nursing
 Diploma in General Nursing
 Diploma in Nurse-Midwifery

College of Medical Technology
 BS and associate degree in Medical Technology
 Diploma Phlebotomy
 Diploma in Clinical Pathology (DCP)
 Diploma in Transfusion Medicine
 MS/MPhil/PGD Medical Technology

College of Rehabilitation sciences
 Doctor of Physical therapy
 Post-Professional Doctor of Physical Therapy
 Accelerated Doctor of Physical Therapy
 MS/MPhil Physical Therapy
 Doctor of Occupational Therapy

College of Speech-Language & Hearing Sciences
 BS in Audiology & Speech-Language Therapy
 Diploma in Childhood Development & Psychopathology

Faculty of Engineering Science & Technology
 BS Software Engineering
 BE Biomedical Engineering
 BE Electrical Engineering
 BE Civil Engineering
 BS Electrical Engineering Technology
 BS Civil Engineering Technology

College of Media Sciences
 BS Communication and Media Studies

References

External links
 Ziauddin University official website

Universities and colleges in Karachi
Educational institutions established in 1986
Private universities and colleges in Sindh
1986 establishments in Pakistan
Engineering universities and colleges in Pakistan